Yvonne Marzinke (born 15 June 1976 in Munich) is a German-born Austrian para-cyclist. She qualified for the 2020 Summer Paralympics.

She competed at the 2019 UCI Para Cycling Road World Championships.  2019 UCI World Cup, and 2021 Paracycling World Cup.

References

External links 

 PARALYMPICS OEPC, equipping Tokyo 2020 VIENNA,AUSTRIA,21 JUL 21 PARALYMPICS OEPC, equipping Paraly
Cancellation Paralympics 2020 – Interview with Yvonne Marzinke
Official website

Cyclists at the 2020 Summer Paralympics
Paralympic cyclists of Austria
Living people
Paralympic athletes of Austria
1976 births
Sportspeople from Munich